Vino 100 is a franchise found throughout North America that focuses on boutique wines, wine education, cigars, and some small-batch scotch and other spirits. Vino 100 LLC is an affiliate of TinderBox International.

References

External links 
 Vino 100 Corporate
 Tinderbox International

Wine retailers
Drink companies of the United States